The 21st Annual D.I.C.E. Awards is the 21st edition of the D.I.C.E. Awards, an annual awards event that honors the best games in the video game industry. It was also held as part of the Academy's 2018 D.I.C.E. Summit, and was co-hosted by Jessica Chobot of Nerdist News, and Kinda Funny co-founder Greg Miller.

The Legend of Zelda: Breath of the Wild won the most awards, including Game of the Year. Horizon Zero Dawn received the most nominations. Nintendo received the most nominations and won the most awards, both as a developer and a publisher.

Genyo Takeda, former CEO and long time Special Corporate Advisor of Nintendo, received the Lifetime Achievement Award.

Winners and Nominees
Winners are listed first, highlighted in boldface, and indicated with a double dagger.

Special Awards

Lifetime Achievement
 Genyo Takeda

Games with multiple nominations and awards

The following 20 games received multiple nominations:

The following six games received multiple awards:

Companies with multiple nominations

Companies that received multiple nominations as either a developer or a publisher.

Companies that received multiple awards as either a developer or a publisher.

Notes

References

External links
 

2018 awards
2018 awards in the United States
February 2018 events in the United States
2017 in video gaming
D.I.C.E. Award ceremonies